"Rosalyn" is the debut single by British rhythm and blues band Pretty Things, released in 1964. It charted at number 41 in the United Kingdom.

History
"Rosalyn" was written by songwriter Jimmy Duncan, who was also co-manager of the Pretty Things with Bryan Morrison at the time, along with Bill Farley, studio owner where the band was recording.  The song was recorded as their debut single on Fontana Records, and became the Pretties first hit, reaching No. 41 on the UK singles chart in January 1964. It features Bo Diddley style lead guitar as well as prominent slide guitar.

Personnel
Phil May - vocals
Dick Taylor - lead guitar
Brian Pendleton - slide/rhythm guitar, vocals 
John Stax - bass, vocals
Viv Prince - drums

Covers
David Bowie recorded "Rosalyn" and released it on his album Pin Ups. It was released as a free sampler single to Record Club members by RCA in New Zealand in November 1973. "Sorrow", was released, as in the rest of the world, as the commercial single from the album. The B-side was "Where Have All the Good Times Gone", another cover from Pin Ups.

In 1972, British rock group Stack Waddy covered the song on their album Bugger Off!.

Charts

References

Pretty Things songs
David Bowie songs
1964 debut singles
Songs written by Jimmy Duncan (songwriter)
1964 songs
Fontana Records singles